Dollrottfeld is a village and a former municipality in the district of Schleswig-Flensburg, in Schleswig-Holstein, Germany. Since March 2018, it is part of the municipality Süderbrarup.

References

Former municipalities in Schleswig-Holstein
Schleswig-Flensburg